Eschenburg (also written Eschenberg on some maps) is a hill in Hesse, Germany. It is located in the borough of Dillenburg, near the villages of Nanzenbach and Wissenbach. With an elevation of 589 metres, it is the town's highest point.

The hill gave its name to the municipality of Eschenburg.

Hills of Hesse
Lahn-Dill-Kreis
Hills of the Gladenbach Uplands